Intelligence Specialist (IS) is a US Navy enlisted rating within the Information Warfare community. The Intelligence Specialist rating was established in 1975 by combining the Photographic Intelligenceman (PT) rating (first established in 1957) and parts of the Yeoman (YN) rating. Initial training ("A" School) was conducted at Lowry Air Force Base in Aurora, Colorado until 1984 when the school was moved to the Navy Marine Corps Intelligence Training Center (NMITC) in Dam Neck, VA. As of September 2018, there are roughly 2950 enlisted Intelligence Specialists in the US Navy.

General description
Military intelligence is a discipline utilized to collect information for decision makers within the military. Intelligence Specialists analyze information from all forms of intelligence (OSINT, HUMINT, SIGINT, etc.) and interpret their value for decision makers. Intelligence Specialists present their information compiled through intelligence briefings and maps.

United States Navy ratings
Naval intelligence
Espionage in the United States